Wes Hohenstein is an American on-camera meteorologist for WNCN (CBS 17) in Raleigh, North Carolina who holds the American Meteorological Society Seal of Approval. Hohenstein brings viewers the weather on CBS 17 at 5, 6 and 11 p.m. and has worked for WNCN since 2006.  He has also worked in Louisiana, Utah, Texas and Arizona. While in Houston, he was known for the Sunshine Award, where he visited schools across southeast Texas in the station's helicopter nearly every day.   He also had the misfortune of swallowing a bug live on TV one day during his weather broadcast and, thanks to the Internet, made news all around the world.

Career
Wesley Hohenstein earned a meteorology degree from Saint Louis University. He began his career in Lafayette, Louisiana working for the CBS station as a weekend meteorologist. After nearly three years at KLFY as weekend and then weekday morning meteorologist, he moved to Salt Lake City.  While in Utah, Wes worked on the morning show for KTVX, the ABC affiliate.

Wes arrived at KPRC-TV in Houston to replace morning meteorologist, Chuck George, who left the station in February 2003 to take care of his ill mother. George eventually landed at KOLD-TV in Tucson, Arizona where he is currently the chief meteorologist.  After nearly three years at KPRC-TV in Houston, Hohenstein was replaced briefly by Byron Miranda and then Anthony Yanez on the morning news. 
After leaving KPRC-TV, Wes was again linked to Chuck George, this time at KOLD-TV while briefly freelancing in Tucson at the same station.  Wes arrived in Raleigh in September 2006 as the Chief Meteorologist at WNCN.

Hohenstein can be seen alongside anchors Angela Taylor, Russ Bowen and Jeff Jones every weeknight on WNCN news at 5, 6 and 11 p.m.  He has also worked with news anchors Melanie Sanders, Pam Saulsby, Sean Maroney, Donald Jones, Bill Fitzgerald and Penn Holderness in the past at WNCN. You can also hear his weather reports on some Cumulus Broadcasting radio stations in the Triangle and Fayetteville.

The station started a promotional campaign in 2012 where Hohenstein is presenting weather facts at the beginning only to reveal an odd setting for the promo part of the way through.  The most unusual of these promos has Hohenstein presenting a weather fact standing in an area lake while in a shirt and tie.  The promos end with the line "I'm Chief Meteorologist Wes Hohenstein and that's a fact."

The promos were well-received in the market and won an Emmy Award for the station in 2014.

In 2013, NBC-17 changed its brand to WNCN to better reflect its local news commitment. Hohenstein has also been a part of several changes on the evening anchor desk at WNCN. Evening news anchor Penn Holderness left the station at the beginning of 2014 followed by news anchor Pam Saulsby departing in the summer of 2014. In early 2016, the station switched from an NBC affiliate, to a CBS affiliate, changing with WRAL-TV.  The station started its life as a CBS affiliate calling itself CBS North Carolina, but switched to CBS 17 in 2018.

Personal life
Hohenstein grew up in the St. Louis, Missouri and is a St. Louis Cardinals fan, he is married and resides in Wake County.

External links
Facebook Page
Twitter Page
Full Station Bio

References

American television meteorologists
Saint Louis University alumni
Living people
Year of birth missing (living people)